Sushma Sharma is an Indian politician and member of the Aam Aadmi party. Sharma was a member of the Himachal Pradesh Legislative Assembly from the Chintpurni constituency in Una district.

References 

People from Una district
Bharatiya Janata Party politicians from Himachal Pradesh
Himachal Pradesh MLAs 1990–1992
Living people
21st-century Indian politicians
Year of birth missing (living people)